The 2012 United States presidential election in the District of Columbia took place on November 6, 2012 as part of the 2012 United States presidential election in which all 50 states and the District of Columbia participated. D.C. voters chose three electors to represent them in the Electoral College via a popular vote pitting incumbent Democratic President Barack Obama and his running mate, Vice President Joe Biden, against Republican challenger and former Massachusetts Governor Mitt Romney and his running mate, Congressman Paul Ryan. Prior to the election, Washington DC was considered to be a definite win for Obama; the nation's capital is heavily Democratic and has always voted for Democratic nominees for president by overwhelming margins.

Obama and Biden carried the District of Columbia with 90.9% of the popular vote to Romney's and Ryan's 7.3%, thus winning the district's three electoral votes.

Primaries

Democratic
President Obama was the only candidate in the primary. The District cast all 45 of its delegate votes at the 2012 Democratic National Convention for Obama.

Republican

The 2012 District of Columbia Republican presidential primary was held on April 3, 2012, the same day as the Maryland and Wisconsin Republican primaries.

The District of Columbia Republican Party required a $5,000 contribution, signatures from one percent of registered Republicans, and the names of 16 potential delegates and 16 alternate delegates, who then must register with the District of Columbia Office of Campaign Finance. Alternatively, under II.D.1(c) a candidate need not file signatures with a $10,000 contribution. The District of Columbia Republican Party certified Newt Gingrich and Ron Paul in lieu of petitions under II.D.1(c). Rick Santorum was not included on the ballot because he did not meet these requirements.

The District of Columbia Republican Party decided not to allow write-in votes for the primary.

The candidate with the most votes in the primary, Mitt Romney, was awarded sixteen delegates. Romney received the most votes in each of the District of Columbia's eight wards, receiving the majority of votes in wards 1, 2, 3, 4, and 6, and a plurality of votes in wards 5, 7, and 8. Paul received the second most votes in wards 1, 2, 4, 5, 6, and 8, while Gingrich received the second most votes in wards 3 and 7. Romney also received the most votes, or tied for the most votes, in 129 of the 143 voting precincts.

The District of Columbia's three superdelegates are Chairman Bob Kabel, Republican National Committeewoman Betsy Werronen, and Republican National Committeeman Tony Parker. Kabel and Werronen both support Mitt Romney. Other delegates for the District of Columbia include Patrick Mara and Rachel Hoff.

Jill Homan and Bob Kabel were elected National Committeewoman and the National Committeeman, respectively. They will both take office after the end of the 2012 Republican National Convention.

General election

Ballot access
 Mitt Romney/Paul Ryan, Republican
 Barack Obama/Joseph Biden, Democratic
 Gary Johnson/James P. Gray, Libertarian
 Jill Stein/Cheri Honkala, Green
Write-in candidate access:
 Virgil Goode/Jim Clymer, Constitution
 Rocky Anderson/Luis J. Rodriguez, Justice

Results

Results by Ward

See also
 United States presidential elections in the District of Columbia
 2012 Republican Party presidential debates and forums
 2012 Republican Party presidential primaries
 Results of the 2012 Republican Party presidential primaries

References

External links
The Green Papers: for District of Columbia
The Green Papers: Major state elections in chronological order

District Of Columbia
United States president
2012